Oier Zearra Garabieta, also known as Zearra (born in Galdakao, Biscay on January 12, 1977), is a Basque pelota player for the Asegarce company. He plays as back-player.

Professional career
He debuted at the Astelena fronton (Eibar) on June 22 of 1997. His main achievement has been the subchampionship in the 2006 1st Hand-Pelota doubles championship, along with Olaizola II.

1st Hand-Pelota doubles championships

2nd Hand-Pelota singles championship

(1) Two championships were played in 1999, due to disagreements between the two main professional Basque-pelota companies—Aspe and Asegarce.

2nd Hand-Pelota doubles championships

Sources & references 
  Oier Zearra profile

1977 births
Amaiur politicians
Living people
Spanish pelotaris
People from Galdakao
Sportspeople from Biscay
Pelotaris from the Basque Country (autonomous community)